Christian Fellowship School (CFS) is a private Protestant Christian school in Columbia, Missouri.  CFS educates from preschool through twelfth grade.

History
CFS began in 1981 with an original enrollment of 24 students.  The school has grown to approximately 370 students and employs over 50 full-time and part-time faculty and staff, serving preschool through high school. CFS students come from over 35 different congregations in the Columbia area, including Baptist, Lutheran, Disciples of Christ, Evangelical Free, Presbyterian, Assembly of God, and nondenominational churches.

Curriculum
The Association of Christian Schools International (ACSI) curriculum is used in both preschool and kindergarten, and the A Beka curriculum is used in elementary 1-6. Art, music, PE, chapel, band, library and computer skills classes supplement this curriculum. Bob Jones University Press and A Beka curricula along with some secular texts comprise the high school curriculum.

Activities
In the fall, boys' soccer and girls' volleyball and cross country is offered. Students as young as seventh grade are encouraged to become involved. In the winter months, boys' and girls' basketball along with both varsity and junior varsity cheerleading are offered. The spring months include girls' soccer, boys baseball, and a coed track team. Christian Fellowship School's sport's teams compete against other Christian and public high school teams throughout the state of Missouri. At the end of each season, the teams go to Joplin, Missouri to compete in the statewide competition of Christian schools.

CFS also offers a ESports team (National Champions 2020), weight lifting, yearbook team and drama team. Each year the drama team performs a play for the school and community. Also at the end of each year, students compete in the Midwest Academic and Fine Arts Festival in Kansas City, Missouri. Academic areas in this competition include art, science projects, musical pieces and performances, written work, and mathematical competitions.

Uniform and Dress Code
CFS requires a uniform in grades K-8. High school students follow a fairly relaxed dress code that simply addresses modesty and appropriate wear for a Christian setting. For students from kindergarten through sixth grade, the uniform consists of navy blue pants, shorts, skirts, or jumpers with white, pink, blue, or red polos or button-down shirts. Once students reach seventh grade, khaki pants, capris, skirts, or shorts may be worn.

Affiliation
CFS is a member of ACSI and the Oral Roberts University Educational Fellowship (ORUEF). CFS is accredited through the International Christian Accrediting Association (ICAA) and AdvancED. CFS is a ministry of Christian Fellowship Church.

External links
Christian Fellowship Church
Christian Fellowship School
International Christian Accrediting Association (ICAA)

Christian schools in Missouri
Educational institutions established in 1981
High schools in Boone County, Missouri
Private middle schools in Missouri
Private elementary schools in Missouri
Private high schools in Missouri
Schools in Columbia, Missouri
Religion in Columbia, Missouri
1981 establishments in Missouri